The Shire of Sherbrooke was a local government area about  east of Melbourne, the state capital of Victoria, Australia. Its largest population centre was the town of Belgrave.

History

Sherbrooke was originally the northwestern part of the Berwick Road District, which was incorporated on 24 October 1862, and became a shire on 12 May 1868. On 23 May 1889, the Scoresby Riding of the shire was severed, and incorporated as the Shire of Fern Tree Gully. With increasing urbanisation in suburbs closer to Melbourne, Fern Tree Gully in turn was splintered on 9 October 1963, to form the City of Knox and the Shire of Sherbrooke, which was named on 23 December 1964.

On 15 December 1994, the Shire of Sherbrooke was abolished, and along with the Shires of Lillydale, Healesville and Upper Yarra, was merged into the newly created Shire of Yarra Ranges. The districts around Emerald merged with the neighbouring Shire of Pakenham, into the newly created Shire of Cardinia, while Upper Ferntree Gully and Lysterfield were transferred to the City of Knox.

Council formerly met at the Shire Offices in Upwey. After the amalgamations, these offices became the Burrinja Cultural Centre.

Wards

The Shire of Sherbrooke was divided into four ridings, each of which elected three councillors:
 Centre Riding
 East Riding
 Emerald Riding
 South Riding

Suburbs and localities

* Council seat.

Population

* Estimate in the 1958 Victorian Year Book.
+ Knox severed in 1963 - Sherbrooke population in 1961 was 16,306, and combined population for 1966 is 65,242.

References

External links
 Victorian Places - Sherbrooke and Sherbrooke Shire

Sherbrooke
1889 establishments in Australia
Shire of Cardinia
1994 disestablishments in Australia
Yarra Ranges
City of Knox